Varyag was the fourth and final ship of the Soviet Navy Project 58 Groznyy-class Guided Missile Cruisers (RKR), also known as the Kynda Class.

Design
Power was provided by two  TV-12 steam turbines, fuelled by four KVN-95/64 boilers and driving two fixed pitch screws.

The ship was designed for anti-ship warfare around two quadruple SM-70 P-35 launchers for 4K44 missiles (NATO reporting name SS-N-3 'Shaddock’), the vessel carrying a full set of reloads making a total of sixteen missiles. To defend against aircraft, the ship was equipped with a single twin ZIF-102 M-1 Volna launcher with sixteen V-600 4K90 (SA-N-1 ‘Goa’) missiles forward and two twin  guns aft, backed up by two single  guns. Four AK-630 close-in weapon systems were added in the early 1980s. Defence against submarines was provided by two triple  torpedoes and a pair of RBU-6000  anti-submarine rocket launchers.

Service
Laid down 13 October 1961 with the name Soobrazitelnyy ( – Astute), the vessel was renamed Varyag on 31 October 1962 while under construction.

Varyag was launched on 7 April 1963 and accepted to the Pacific Fleet on 23 September 1965 as part of the 175th Anti-Submarine Warfare Brigade, sailing to Vladivostok via the northern sea route. The vessel served in the Indian Ocean between 13 December 1971 and 6 March 1972 as part of a substantial Soviet naval presence during the Indo-Pakistani War ostensibly as a counterweight to ensure non-intervention by the Royal Navy and US Navy. Between 1975 and 1981, Varyag underwent repairs and modernisation, returning to service in the Indian Ocean with a cruise that included a visit to Da Nang, Vietnam between 10 and 14 October 1981.  The ship was attached to the 183rd Anti-Submarine Warfare Brigade from 1 March 1985, taking part in a large surface fleet exercise with other Soviet vessels between 7 and 10 October 1988.

Varyag was the first in the class to be decommissioned, being stricken in April 1990.

Pennant numbers

References

1963 ships
Kynda-class cruisers
Ships built at Severnaya Verf
Cold War cruisers of the Soviet Union